Phelipara lineata is a species of beetle in the family Cerambycidae. It was described by Schwarzer in 1930.

References

Agapanthiini
Beetles described in 1930